Pluto was discovered in 1930 and has made several appearances in fiction since. It was initially popular as it was newly discovered and thought to be the outermost object of the Solar System. Alien life, sometimes intelligent life and occasionally an entire ecosphere, is a common motif in fictional depictions of Pluto.

Pluto 
The earliest story featuring Pluto was likely the satirical 1931 novel Into Plutonian Depths by Stanton A. Coblentz, which depicts an advanced Plutonian civilization. Other early depictions are found in the 1935 short story "The Red Peri" by Stanley G. Weinbaum, where it houses a base for space pirates, and the 1936 short story "En Route to Pluto" by Wallace West, where it is inhabited by mist creatures. Pluto is terraformed in the 1944 short story "Circle of Confusion" by George O. Smith and colonized in the 1958 novel Man of Earth by Algis Budrys. Aliens from elsewhere have settled Pluto in the 1950 novel First Lensman by E. E. Smith. The 1970 novel World's Fair 1992 by Robert Silverberg portrays an astrobiological expedition to Pluto. An astronaut is stranded on Pluto in the 1968 short story "Wait it Out" by Larry Niven. Pluto is found to be artificial in the 1973 short story "Construction Shack" by Clifford D. Simak, and an artefact resembling Stonehenge bearing Sanskrit text is discovered on it in the 1984 novel Icehenge by Kim Stanley Robinson. In the 1959 novel The Secret of the Ninth Planet by Donald A. Wollheim, Pluto originally came from a different solar system and its inhabitants are malevolent. A complex planetary ecosphere on Pluto is depicted in the 1988 novel Iceborn by Gregory Benford and Paul A. Carter. Pluto was reclassified from planet to dwarf planet in 2006, a subject which was later explored in the 2011 novel Young Tales of the Old Cosmos by Rhys Hughes.

Charon 
Pluto's moon Charon was discovered in 1977 and appears as a setting in the 1990 novels Take Back Plenty by Colin Greenland and The Ring of Charon by Roger MacBride Allen.

References

External links 
 Pluto in Science Fiction bibliography